The 2015–16 Air Force Falcons women's basketball team represents the United States Air Force Academy during the 2015–16 NCAA Division I women's basketball season. The Falcons, led by first head coach Chris Gobrecht, play their home games at the Clune Arena on the Air Force Academy's main campus in Colorado Springs, Colorado and were members of the Mountain West Conference. They finished the season 1–29, 1–17 in Mountain West play to finish in last place. They lost in the first round of the Mountain West women's tournament to UNLV.

Roster

Schedule and results 

|-
!colspan=9 style="background:#0038A8; color:#A8ADB4;"| Exhibition

|-
!colspan=9 style="background:#0038A8; color:#A8ADB4;"| Non-conference regular season

|-
!colspan=9 style="background:#0038A8; color:#A8ADB4;"| Mountain West regular season

|-
!colspan=9 style="background:#0038A8; color:#A8ADB4;"| Mountain West Women's Tournament

See also
 2015–16 Air Force Falcons men's basketball team

References 

Air Force
Air Force Falcons women's basketball seasons
Air Force Falcons women's basketball
Air Force Falcons women's basketball